Svetlana Vaklua (born September 5, 1977) is a Belarusian sprint canoer who competed in the early 2000s. At the 2000 Summer Olympics in Sydney, she finished sixth in the K-4 500 m event while being eliminated in the semifinals of the K-2 500 m event.

References
Sports-Reference.com profile

1977 births
Belarusian female canoeists
Canoeists at the 2000 Summer Olympics
Living people
Olympic canoeists of Belarus
21st-century Belarusian women